István Szimcsák (22 July 1933 – 27 July 2003) was a Hungarian footballer. He played in six matches for the Hungary national football team from 1955 to 1961.

References

1933 births
2003 deaths
Hungarian footballers
Hungary international footballers
Place of birth missing
Association footballers not categorized by position